The Cathedral Church of St Edan is a cathedral of the Church of Ireland in Ferns, County Wexford in Ireland. It is in the ecclesiastical province of Dublin. Until 1949, the designation of the cathedral was the Cathedral Church of St. Ædan, a variant spelling of Edan or Aidan.

Previously the cathedral of the Diocese of Ferns, it is now one of six cathedrals in the Diocese of Cashel and Ossory.

History
The original medieval Roman Catholic cathedral was built by Bishop St. John in the 1230s. A Catholic cathedral, also dedicated to Saint Aidan, was erected in Enniscorthy in the nineteenth century to a design by Pugin.

The building was burnt down in Elizabethan times by the O'Byrnes of Wicklow, and only a small portion of the ruins remain. Although Queen Elizabeth I of England ordered it rebuilt, only a section of the choir was restored. This was subsequently further altered in the early 1800s. The cathedral was reordered again in the early 1900s through the efforts of Thomas Brownell Gibson, Dean from 1908 until 1926. An internal chancel arch was raised, and a quire and sanctuary created. Chapter stalls were re-used from Kilkenny cathedral (the classical stalls which they replaced are now in the extensive chapter house to the west of Ferns cathedral ). A new episcopal 'cathedra' was provided and the flat plaster ceiling of the church was replaced with one of boarded wood in a gothic revival style.

Of the surviving medieval fabric, the blind arcading of the chancel is of particular note as are the north and south lancets and viscae of the East Wall. The central lancets are a conjectural restoration. There is a very fine medieval episcopal effigy by the font and the remains of some pillars of the quire arcade are to be seen in the walls to the west of the new chancel arch. The eighteenth or early nineteenth century west tower may well be on the site of a crossing of the mediaeval cathedral. An earlier belief that the present cathedral was part of the nave of the older building was based on the existence of remains of a separate medieval church, on the same axis, some way to the east. The chancel arcade and Eastern lancets challenge this conjecture as does the marked difference in floor level which, in the Eastern fragment, is some metres lower.

Richard de Clare, 2nd Earl of Pembroke (of the first creation), Lord of Leinster, Justiciar of Ireland (1130 – 20 April 1176), also commonly known as Strongbow (French: Arc-Fort), is sometimes said to have been interred at Ferns Cathedral, but there is no evidence for this, and Giraldus Cambrensis, who was a contemporary eyewitness, specifically notes that he was buried within sight of the cross at Christ Church Cathedral in Dublin.

Burials
Diarmait Mac Murchada
Domhnall Caomhánach
Richard of Northampton

Vandalism
The cathedral was vandalised in early 2009 by youths. Many panes of glass were broken in the cathedral and the pane of glass protecting the magnificent east window was cracked. Headstones in the adjacent St Peter's Cemetery were knocked over, but St. Peter's cemetery and church are under the control of both Catholic and Anglican Churches in the town. Vandalism is common in all three churches in the town and also the abbey.

References

See also

List of cathedrals in Ireland
Bishop of Ferns
Dean of Ferns

Diocese of Cashel and Ossory
Anglican cathedrals in the Republic of Ireland
Religious buildings and structures in County Wexford
Gothic Revival church buildings in the Republic of Ireland